Atrocity crimes have been committed during the Russo–Ukrainian War, chiefly by the Russian Federation and its proxy forces in Ukraine's Donbas region, but also by Ukraine.

Atrocity crimes is a legally defined group of offences against international law, that includes war crimes, crimes against humanity, and genocide, and is often considered to include the non-legally defined ethnic cleansing. Since the 2014 Russian invasion and annexation of Crimea, the war in Donbas, and the 2022 Russian invasion of Ukraine, numerous atrocity crimes have been identified, and some are being or have been tried in courts.

See also

War crimes and crimes against humanity 

 Humanitarian situation during the war in Donbas
 
 Sexual violence in the 2022 Russian invasion of Ukraine
 Torture in Ukraine
 Ukrainian cultural heritage during the 2022 Russian invasion
 War crimes in the 2022 Russian invasion of Ukraine

Genocide 

 Allegations of child abductions in the 2022 Russian invasion of Ukraine
 Claims of genocide of Ukrainians in the 2022 Russian invasion of Ukraine

Other 

 Accusations of genocide in Donbas

References 

War crimes in Ukraine
Crimes against humanity
Ethnic cleansing
Genocides in Europe
Russo-Ukrainian War